The Historic Derby Street Chapel, also known as Derby Street Chapel, is a historic church building located at 121 Derby Street in Cocoa, Brevard County, Florida. Built between 1916 and 1920 as a Seventh-day Adventist church, it was sold to First Church of Christ, Scientist, Cocoa in 1955. In 1964 the Christian Science sold it to the First Baptist Church of Cocoa, which still owns it. Cocoa Mainstreet, which holds a 25-year lease on the property, renovated the building and brought it up to current handicapped access standards. It is now a venue for weddings, vow renewals, memorials and other small events.

References

Churches completed in 1920
Baptist churches in Florida
Churches in Brevard County, Florida
Cocoa, Florida
Former Christian Science churches, societies and buildings in Florida
Seventh-day Adventist churches in the United States
1920 establishments in Florida
Former Seventh-day Adventist institutions